Sarah Hudson (born 23 April 1988) is an Australian actress.

Hudson made her film debut as Julie in 2:37, which was released on 17 August 2006. She was born in Adelaide, South Australia and is currently based in Sydney.

Filmography
2:37 (2006)
Chuck Finn (TV) (1999)

References

External links 

2:37 official web site

1988 births
Living people
Australian film actresses
Australian television actresses
Actresses from Adelaide